Steven Michael Wojciechowski (born August 11, 1976), also known as Wojo, is an American basketball coach and former player who was the head coach at Marquette University for seven seasons. He previously played and coached under head coach Mike Krzyzewski at Duke University. He was a point guard from 1994 to 1998.

Biography

Playing career

High school
Wojciechowski is a 1994 graduate of the Cardinal Gibbons School in Baltimore, Maryland, where he played under Baltimore Catholic League head coach Ray Mullis. Rated one of the top high school players in the country, Wojciechowski was named to the East squad of the 1994 McDonald's All-American Team, playing against future Duke teammates Trajan Langdon and Ricky Price.

Duke
Highly recruited out of high school, Wojciechowski signed to play with Duke.

Midway through Wojciechowski's freshman season, the Duke coach, Mike Krzyzewski, had to take a medical leave. The team stumbled to a 13–18 record, the school's only losing season since 1982–83; it was also Duke's only non-NCAA-tournament season between 1983 and 2021.

During Wojciechowski's last three years, the Duke Blue Devils achieved an 74–26 record. A captain during his senior year, Wojciechowski led that 1997–98 team to a 32–4 record and a final #1 ranking in the AP regular season poll. In the NCAA tournament, the Duke team reached the South Regional final, losing to the eventual champion, Kentucky, 86–84.

During that senior year, Wojciechowski was named NABC Defensive Player of the Year honors and was an honorable mention All-American.

Overall, Wojo appeared in 128 games for Duke, starting 88. He is ranked eighth at Duke for career steals (203) and eighth for career assists (505).  He also achieved the second highest number of steals in a single season with 82 in 1997.

A first-generation college student, Wojciechowski earned his bachelor's degree from Duke in 1998.

Following his graduation from Duke, Wojciechowski played professional basketball in Poland for a year.

Coaching career

Duke

He returned to Duke in 1999 as an intern in the Duke Management Company and was a basketball analyst on the Duke Radio Network.

Wojciechowski was then offered a coaching job by Krzyzewski and began his career as an assistant coach in 1999. He was promoted to associate coach in 2008. During his 14 years on the Duke bench, Wojciechowski primarily coached Duke's frontcourt players. Two of them, Shane Battier and Shelden Williams, were national defensive players of the year, while those who went on to successful NBA careers include Carlos Boozer, Rodney Hood, Josh McRoberts, Jabari Parker, Mason Plumlee, Miles Plumlee, and Lance Thomas. Compiling an overall record of 441–92 during his time as an assistant and associate head coach, the Blue Devils won the NCAA championship in 2001 and 2010.

Wojo was also an assistant on the USA National senior team from 2006 to 2014, including the teams that won the Olympic gold medal in 2008 and 2012.

Marquette
On April 1, 2014, Wojciechowski was hired as the new Marquette head basketball coach, replacing Buzz Williams, who left for Virginia Tech. At Marquette, he compiled a 124–93 record, including two NCAA tournament invitations. This included a losing record during his first season followed by 5 consecutive winning seasons. However, with no Big East titles and an 0–2 NCAA Tournament record in 7 seasons, Wojciechowski was fired at the conclusion of the 2020–2021 season.

Head coaching record

References

External links
 Marquette profile

1976 births
Living people
American expatriate basketball people in Poland
American men's basketball players
American people of Polish descent
Basketball coaches from Maryland
Basketball players from Maryland
Duke Blue Devils men's basketball coaches
Duke Blue Devils men's basketball players
Marquette Golden Eagles men's basketball coaches
McDonald's High School All-Americans
People from Severna Park, Maryland
Point guards
Shooting guards
Sportspeople from Anne Arundel County, Maryland